Norfolk, Virginia native Alan McCullough Jr. (c.1909 – July 13, 1993) was a 20th-century modernist architect who found popularity after World War II for his Virginia residences. His work in Richmond, Norfolk and the Northern Neck married modern design and planning with local elements like colonial brick and buff-colored mortar. Like other regional architects such as Virginia Beach's Lewis Rightmier, Richmond's E. Tucker Carlton and Alexandria's Charles M. Goodman, McCullough took the open plans, striking geometry and low profiles of houses by Frank Lloyd Wright and built houses with regional elements appropriate to Virginia's climate and history. McCullough's trademark features includes terrazzo floors and raised fireplaces with levitating hearths.

Notable schools by McCullough include Richmond's Collegiate School and the annex to the City of Richmond, Virginia's Blackwell School. McCullough also designed buildings for C&P Telephone, United Virginia Bank and The Tides Inn. McCullough retired in 1972 to Lancaster County, Virginia in the Northern Neck, and continued to work. He died at age 84 in a Richmond hospital.

McCullough's father named the Virginia Beach, Virginia subdivision Alanton after him.

Notes

1900s births
1993 deaths
Artists from Norfolk, Virginia
Architects from Richmond, Virginia
20th-century American architects